Derveshpur is a village located in Shikarpur Tehsil of Bulandshahr district in Uttar Pradesh, India.

The location code or village code of Derveshpur village is 121382 as per 2011 census information. Derveshpur village is located in Shikarpur Tehsil of Bulandshahr  district in the state of Uttar Pradesh, India.

References 

Villages in Bulandshahr district